G is a 2002 American drama film directed by Christopher Scott Cherot. It is loosely based on the 1925 novel The Great Gatsby by F. Scott Fitzgerald.

The title character, G, played by Richard T. Jones, is a hip-hop music mogul who is looking to win back the love of his life, Sky (based on the character Daisy Buchanan from the original novel).

Cast

Release
G made its worldwide premiere on May 10, 2002 at the Tribeca Film Festival in United States. It made its theatrical premiere on October 28, 2005 in the US, more than 3 years from its initial premiere. Since then, it has been released on DVD in Spain, Iceland, and Hungary.

External links
 
 
 
 
 
 

2002 films
2002 drama films
Films scored by Bill Conti
Films based on The Great Gatsby
African-American drama films
2000s hip hop films
2000s English-language films
2000s American films